Taito Legends 2 is the sequel to Taito Legends and is a follow-up collection of 39 (or 43, see below) Taito arcade games for Xbox, PlayStation 2 and Microsoft Windows. As the former collection, it has been derived from the Japan exclusive Taito Memories series.

All three versions of the game were simultaneously released in March 2006 in Europe and Australia and published by Empire Interactive. The United States received the PlayStation 2 version on 16 May 2007 and the PC version on 10 July 2007 with publishing by Destineer. For unknown reasons, the Xbox version was never released in North America. However, the European PAL-region Xbox version is entirely compatible with the North American NTSC-based Xbox systems without any modifications.

The PlayStation 2 version uses the same layout and engine as the Taito Memories series, while the Xbox & PC versions uses the layout and engine of Taito Legends, with additional content on some games.

Eight of the 43 games - Balloon Bomber, Bubble Symphony, Cadash, RayForce, RayStorm, G-Darius, Pop'n Pop, and Syvalion - were split across the platforms due to porting issues, requiring players to buy more than one version to get every game available.

Games
Taito Legends 2 consists of the following 43 arcade games when combined whilst each version contains 39 games. Balloon Bomber, G-Darius, RayStorm and Syvalion are exclusive to the PlayStation 2 version whilst Bubble Symphony, Cadash, Pop'n Pop and RayForce are exclusive to the PC and Xbox versions.

The titles included in the Western release were taken directly from various volumes of the Japanese Taito Memories-series:
 
 
 
 

The only title included in Taito Legends 2 that was not previously included in the Japanese Taito Memories series is Pop 'n Pop, though an earlier standalone PlayStation port of the game was released in Japan.

In addition, the North American PS2 version replaces Puzzle Bobble 2 (the original Japanese version) with Bust-a-Move Again, the game's North American equivalent. It also has a loading times during RayStorm and G-Darius. G-Darius uses full motion video on intro, ending and some of the cutscenes of the game.

Reception

The PC and Xbox versions of Taito Legends 2 received "favourable" reviews, while the PlayStation 2 version received "average" reviews, according to the review aggregation website Metacritic. Major criticisms include the large amount of obscure and "filler" titles, all of which are from the Japanese Taito Memories collections in which they are little known in the U.S. (with GameSpot quoting: "There's really nothing legendary about most of the old arcade games found in Taito Legends 2"), as well as unresponsive, "flipped", and clunky controls. Kristan Reed of Eurogamer wrote a more positive response: "It's all but impossible to make an objective assessment that takes into account everyone's hugely varying tastes. What's definitely unarguable, though, that this particular package has much better presentation than the last one, with all games sorted into chronological order (a small but valuable point), and various useful options that make the experience far better than most retro collections". Some reviewers also compared Taito Legends 2 unfavorably with the Sega Genesis Collection, writing the aforementioned Genesis Collection as superior, and was also criticized for its lack of bonus content (asides from instructions panels that can be viewed in the main menu and during gameplay).

References

External links
Destineer site
Empire support site: PC Xplosiv, PS2 Xplosiv, Xbox Empire

2006 video games
Windows games
PlayStation 2 games
Xbox games
Taito games
Square Enix video game compilations
Taito video game compilations
Video games developed in the United Kingdom
Empire Interactive games
Video games developed in Japan
Multiplayer and single-player video games